Cnemaspis calderana is a species of gecko endemic to Sumatra in Indonesia.

References

Cnemaspis
Reptiles described in 2021